Capitolio (the Spanish for capitol) can refer to:
Colombia: Capitolio Nacional in Bogotá
Cuba: El Capitolio in Havana
Puerto Rico: Capitolio de Puerto Rico in San Juan
Venezuela: Capitolio Federal in Caracas
 Capitolio, a metro station in Cararcas.

In Portuguese:
Capitólio, a municipality in the Brazilian state of Minas Gerais